Chemische Werke Kluthe GmbH is a German-based chemical company headquartered in Heidelberg. The Kluthe group has 23 German and 39 international marketing bases and produces a total of 160,000 tons of goods to supply in 51 countries.

Business segments 
Chemische Werke Kluthe GmbH develops, produces and sells chemicals and chemical processes for surface treatment. The product range covers (among others) cooling lubricants, industrial cleaning agents, pre-treatment solutions, preservatives solvents, flushing media for paints and lacquers, de-lacquerers and chemicals for water treatment.

The Kluthe group supplies the worldwide automotive industry, their subcontractors, as well as the industries of construction and agricultural machinery, steel, cans and plastic components.
The company also supplies painters via specialist and wholesale trade.

History
Chemische Werke Kluthe GmbH was founded in 1950 by Maria and Wilhelm Kluthe. At this time, laboratory and production line were set up in a garage.

The first product was a universal solvent and thinner. In 1953, the firm developed the first de-lacquerer applicable at room temperature, an advance on to the then customary hot alkaline de-lacquering.

In 1954, the company bought its first property in Gottlieb-Daimler-Straße, Heidelberg (Germany), and installed a small distillation unit to recover organic solvents. The idea of supplying chemicals and recovering valuable resources from residual materials led to the development of the firm's "5-C-Concept": Cut, Clean, Coat, Conserve, Clear.

The 1969 acquisition of Sahm-Chemie, formed the basis of the group's product line for the lacquer industry.

In 1973, a second manufacturing location was built in Wieblingen, Heidelberg (Germany) to meet rising demand. Wieblingen is today home to the Research and Development center for surface treatment products.

The current group structure has existed since 2016; since this year, Kluthe Chemicals GmbH & Co KG has acted as the parent company of the group. The Canadian subsidiary Kluthe Sustainability Management was founded in 2019.

Recycling 
The waste-treatment company Rematec GmbH, a 100% subsidiary of Chemische Werke Kluthe GmbH is the company’s take on sustainability in chemistry. In Mügeln (Germany) and Wieblingen (Germany), Rematec collects residuary chemicals of their Kluthe clients to recover valuable resources from paints, lacquers, organic solvents and architectural paints and lacquers.

Architectural paints and lacquers 
In 1997, the Kluthe group expanded its product line with high-quality architectural paints by acquisition of the Oberhausen (Germany)-based Continental Lack- und Farbenwerke Friedrich Wilhelm Wiegand und Söhne GmbH. Today, Oberhausen is home to central research and development and production for the architectural paints division. In Asperg, Conti-Coating produces thinners in small packages for painters, consumers and Conti-Coatings BENELUX (Alphen, Netherlands).

Raw materials 
Recently, a Kluthe-group production company in Mügeln (Germany) started producing microbeads and fillers for the lacquer and cosmetic industries respectively.

Further production sites and sales organization 
Alphen aan den Rijn (NL) is the group's biggest production site outside Germany and supplies the whole of the Benelux market.

In Kuntzig (France), the Kluthe group produces lacquers, solvents and thinners, as well as cleaning agents, de-lacquerers and coagulants for the French market.

A production site in Guadalajara (Spain) supplies the Spanish and Maghrib market with the whole range of pre-treatment products and chemicals for water treatment.

Independent sales and service companies operate under the Kluthe brand in Poland, Czech Republic, Belgium, UK, Switzerland and Austria. Licensees and distributors represent the Kluthe group in Finland, Hungary, Romania, Belarus, Ukraine, Russia, Croatia and Serbia.

A site in Bursa (Turkey) covers the Turkish and Middle Eastern markets.

Kluthe subsidiaries in Brazil and Mexico are active since 2012 and 2014 respectively. A Chicago base supplies, and a Detroit base supervises the US and Canadian markets.

Kluthe-India supplies Kluthe products for the cleaning, cooling lubricants and conserving markets. Kluthe Chemicals Shanghai supervises the Chinese, Taiwanese, Thai and Vietnamese markets.

References

Chemical companies of Germany
German companies established in 1950
Chemical companies established in 1950